Folgers Coffee is a brand of ground, instant, and single-use pod coffee produced and sold in the United States, with additional distribution in Asia, Canada and Mexico. It forms part of the food and beverage division of The J.M. Smucker Company.

History
"J.A. Folger & Co. were established in 1850 as Wm. H. Bovee & Co"

The precursor of the Folger Coffee Company was founded in 1850 in San Francisco, California, as the Pioneer Steam Coffee and Spice Mills. The founding owner, William H. Bovee, saw an opportunity to produce roasted and ground coffee ready for brewing. Before that, Californians had to purchase green coffee beans, and roast and grind them on their own. To help build his mill, Bovee hired James Athearn (J.A.) Folger as a carpenter. Folger had arrived from Nantucket Island at age 15 with his two older brothers during the California Gold Rush. In the 1850s, kerosene became a cheaper alternative to whale oil, Nantucket's dominant business.  Many Nantucket ships were re-purposed to instead bring coffee from South America to San Francisco. After working at Bovee's mill for nearly a year, Folger had saved enough money to buy part of the company, and went to mine for gold. He agreed to carry samples of coffee and spices, taking orders from grocery stores along the way. Upon his return to San Francisco in 1865, Folger became a full partner at Pioneer Steam Coffee and Spice Mills. In 1872, he bought out the other partners and renamed the company J.A. Folger & Co.

In 1861, James Folger married. He and his wife had four children, and two of the children worked for the family business. In 1889, Folger died, and his oldest son, James A. Folger II, became president of J.A. Folger & Co at the age of 26.

In the 1900s, the company began to grow dramatically due primarily to a salesman named Frank P. Atha. Atha sold coffee in the California area, but proposed to James Folger II that he open and manage a Folgers Coffee plant in Texas. The company grew exponentially after Atha opened the Texas plant.

Under the mid-20th century leadership of Peter Folger, the brand became one of the principal coffee concerns in North America. Procter & Gamble acquired Folger's in 1963 and removed the apostrophe from its name. During P&G's ownership, Folgers became the number one coffee brand in America.

On August 9, 1969, company heiress Abigail Folger was stabbed to death in Los Angeles as part of the Manson Family's Tate–LaBianca murders.

P&G announced in January 2008 that Folgers would be spun off into a separate Cincinnati-based company but reversed itself that June and announced Folgers would be acquired by the end of 2008 by The J.M. Smucker Company. Utilizing a rare financial technique called a Reverse Morris Trust, Smucker purchased Folgers in November 2008 and made it a subsidiary, whose products lead the 10 billion USD at-home retail coffee category.

Brands
Folgers established brand colors, included on their logo, were traditionally a moderately dark red background with white lettering. The white or grey lettering is still used, with a green background signifying decaf and a black background signifying their Noir dark roast.

Folgers products available in the United States include:
Ground coffee in cans
100% Colombian (medium roast)
Black Silk (dark roast), also available in decaf
Brazilian blend (medium roast)
Breakfast blend (mild roast)
Classic roast (medium roast), also in decaf and half caff
Coffeehouse blend (medium-dark roast)
Country roast (medium-dark roast)
French roast (medium-dark roast)
Gourmet Supreme (medium-dark roast)
House blend (medium roast)
Special roast (medium roast)

Folgers Noir, a line of dark roast coffees
Simply Smooth, a mild roast coffee intended to be gentler on the stomach, also in decaf
Simply Gourmet, a line of naturally flavored coffees
Folgers Flavors, French vanilla and hazelnut flavored coffees, also available as decaf hazelnut
Folgers Crystals, instant coffee available in regular and decaf
Coffee Singles, single-serve packets
Cappuccino instant mixes
K-cup pods in a variety of roasts and flavors
1850, a premium brand launched in 2018

In Canada, Folgers is primarily available as Classic Roast and Mountain Roast.

In the United Kingdom, Folgers Instant Crystals are available.

Advertising

Folgers is promoted with the slogan "The best part of waking up is Folgers in your cup!" It is well associated with a jingle featured in almost every advertisement since 1984, with lyrics by Susan Spiegel Solovay and Bill Vernick, and music by Leslie Pearl. Over the years it has been rearranged and performed by many famous musicians, such as Richie Havens, Randy Travis, Bonnie Tyler, Paul Stanley, Aretha Franklin, and Rockapella.

From 1965 to 1986, Folgers was known for television ads involving "Mrs. Olson", a Swedish neighbor played by Virginia Christine who invariably recommended a cup of Folgers coffee for the characters in the commercial.

Folgers promoted their instant coffee in the 1970s and early 1980s ads which took the viewer inside various 'high-end' restaurants while a voice-over (by Bryan Clark) whispered to the viewer that they've secretly switched the coffee used at the restaurant with Folgers, and watched the restaurants' patrons to see if they could tell whether or not they noticed the difference.

One Folgers television ad from 1985, "Peter Comes Home For Christmas," became particularly associated with the Christmas holidays. A college student returns home, apparently on Christmas Day. His younger sister is the first one to greet Peter, helping him make the Folgers. The smell of freshly brewed coffee awakening his parents and alerting them to their son's arrival. The Cunningham & Walsh spot aired yearly until 1998, then in edited form in 2004 and 2005.

In the mid-1980s Folgers became a  NASCAR sponsor. After a trial season with the Joe Ruttman-driven and Larry McClure-owned Chevrolet in 1985, Folgers expanded its sponsorships.

In 2006, the advertising agency Saatchi & Saatchi created a viral advertisement, popularly known as "Happy Mornings", in which a large group of cheerful singers and dancers appear at sunrise as the sun itself to wake people up.

In 2009, Saatchi & Saatchi created a holiday ad, "Coming Home", where an older brother is met by his teenage sister at their parents home on returning from volunteering in West Africa. The ad quickly went viral and has been criticized for perceived sexual tensions between the siblings.

In 2014, the brand celebrated the 30th anniversary of the famous jingle.

Building

The brick, five-story Folger Coffee Company Building at 101 Howard in San Francisco, California is the former headquarters of Folgers. It is listed on the United States National Register of Historic Places. The building still has a sign saying "The Folgers Coffee Company" on one corner.

On August 2, 2011, the Folger Building was purchased by the University of San Francisco, marking a return to the university's roots in downtown San Francisco.

In popular culture
In the 1998 film The Big Lebowski, after one of the protagonists dies, their ashes are transported to the Pacific Ocean in a Folgers coffee can because the cheapest urn is deemed too expensive. The film has become a cult classic, and at least one person has cosplayed as a can of Folgers during a fan event.

In the 1991 Seinfeld episode "The Library", Jerry is challenged by Lt. Bookman (played by Philip Baker Hall) on why there is no instant coffee available for guests to his apartment: "You buy a jar of Folger's Crystals, you put it in the cupboard, you forget about it. Then later on when you need it, it's there. It lasts forever. It's freeze-dried. Freeze-dried crystals."

The November 16, 1991 episode of Saturday Night Live had a sketch that parodied the 'high end restaurant' commercials from the 1970s and 1980s, showing a customer (Chris Farley) violently losing his temper upon being informed that he was given another company's coffee blend instead of the restaurant's usual blend.

Notes and references

Notes

References

Further reading
The Folger Way: Coffee Pioneering Since 1850, by Ruth Waldo Newhall (1910–2003), married to Scott Newhall (1914–1992), late of the San Francisco Chronicle, J.A. Folger (publisher) (1961);

External links
 
 Selection of 20th Century Folgers commercials

Coffee brands
Articles containing video clips
Food and drink companies established in 1850
Former Procter & Gamble brands
Companies based in San Francisco
1850 establishments in California
Food and drink in the San Francisco Bay Area
The J.M. Smucker Co. brands
American brands
Drink companies based in California
1963 mergers and acquisitions
2008 mergers and acquisitions